Jane's F-15, also known as simply F-15, is a combat flight simulator video game developed and released by Electronic Arts in 1998 for the PC. It models the McDonnell Douglas F-15E Strike Eagle. EA's 2000 Jane's F/A-18 used an improved version of F-15'''s game engine.

Gameplay

The game has two campaigns: one based on the 1991 Gulf War and the other focusing on a fictional conflict with Iran.

The virtual cockpit was one of the first of its kind, but the game still featured a 2D cockpit which also allowed the player to switch between the pilot and the weapon systems officer seat in the back of the cockpit to monitor the different multi-functional displays.

Reception

The game received favorable reviews. Next Generation described the game for having fast-paced and hot-and-heavy air combat and challenging AI.

The game sold 126,461 copies in the U.S. and earned $5 million by October 1999.

The game was a finalist for the Academy of Interactive Arts & Sciences' 1997 "Simulation Game of the Year" award, which ultimately went to Microsoft Flight Simulator 98. The game was also a finalist for Computer Gaming Worlds 1998 "Best Simulation" award, CNET Gamecenters 1998 Best Combat Flight Sim award, and IGNs "Best Simulation of the Year" award, all of which ultimately went to European Air War. It was also a runner-up for Computer Games Strategy Plus "Simulation Game of the Year" award, losing again to European Air War. The staff called the former "extremely impressive". PC Gamer US also nominated the game as the best simulation of 1998, but it lost to Falcon 4.0.

See also
 Falcon 4.0''

References

External links

1998 video games
Combat flight simulators
Electronic Arts games
Jane's Combat Simulations
Video games set in Iran
Video games set in Iraq
Video games set in 1991
Gulf War video games
Video games with historical settings
Windows games
Windows-only games
Multiplayer and single-player video games
Video games developed in the United States